The 1947 Tour de France was the 34th edition of the Tour de France, taking place from 25 June to 20 July. It was the first Tour since 1939, having been cancelled during World War II, although some Tour de France-like races had been held during World War II.

Because the previous races had been canceled, there was no real favourite for the final victory. When René Vietto, the runner-up of 1939, captured the yellow jersey after his victory on the second stage, many thought he could remain first until the last day. Vietto, a climber, was less optimistic and lost his first place to Italian Pierre Brambilla after the time trial in stage 19. With only two stages to go, many now believed that Brambilla would win the race. On the last stage, there was an unexpected attack, and little-known French cyclist Jean Robic captured the lead. Robic had won the Tour de France without ever wearing the yellow jersey during the race, the first time that happened. (In 1953 Robic would lead the race for one more day).

Background

After the 1939 Tour de France, the Second World War had made it impossible to organise a big cycling event in France, although some attempts had been taken. The rights on the Tour de France, previously owned by l'Auto, had been transferred to the French government. There were two newspapers interested in taking over these rights, so they both organised cycling events. The event organised by l'Équipe, "La Course du Tour de France", was more successful, and l'Équipe was given the right to organise the 1947 Tour de France.

Teams

The national teams format, which had been in use before the Second World War, was used again in 1947. The German team was not invited, and the Italian team was made up of Franco-Italians living in France,  as the peace treaty between France and Italy was not yet official, so the countries were technically still at war.

The Tour organisers invited ten teams of ten cyclists each. Besides the Italian team, there was also a French team and a Belgian team, and a combined Swiss/Luxembourgian team. The plan was to have a joint Dutch-British team, but the Dutch cyclists protested because the British cyclists were too inexperienced, and the British cyclists were replaced by "French strangers". There were also five French regional teams: Île-de-France, West, North-East, Centre/South-West and South-East. Of the 100 cyclists, 53 finished the race.

The teams entering the race were:

 Belgium
 Netherlands/Strangers of France
 Italy
 Switzerland/Luxembourg
 France
 Île-de-France
 West
 North-East
 Centre/South-West
 South-East

Route and stages

The 1947 Tour de France started on 25 June, and had five rest days, in Besançon, Briançon, Nice, Luchon and Vannes.

Race overview

After Ferdinand Kübler had won the first stage, René Vietto took the lead by winning the second stage. After the third stage only Aldo Ronconi was within 90 seconds of Vietto, and the third man in the general classification was already more than eight minutes behind.

In the seventh stage, when the Alps mountains were climbed, Ronconi took over the lead, but two stages later Vietto took back the lead, helped by Apo Lazaridès.

Jean Robic had lost six minutes in that ninth stage, and lost more time in the tenth stage. He was already more than 25 minutes behind, and was no longer considered a favourite, but Robic was convinced that he would win the Tour.

In the fourteenth stage, Albert Bourlon escaped directly after the start. He stayed away until the end of the stage,  later. This is the longest escape in the Tour de France after the second World War.

In the fifteenth stage, Robic escaped in the Pyrénees, and beat the other by more than ten minutes. Because of the time bonuses for reaching the mountain tops first, he even won back more than fifteen minutes. In the general classification, Robic rose to fifth place.
With only three stages to go in the Tour, Vietto was still in the lead, 94 seconds ahead of Pierre Brambilla. The nineteenth stage was an individual time trial, the longest in Tour history. In that stage, Vietto lost considerable time, and Brambilla took over the lead in the general classification. Vietto performed worse than expected; there was speculation about why he performed so badly, and some said it was because of the motorcycle accident of a friend, while others said it was because he drank a bottle of cider during the time trial.

The last stage was flat, which makes it hard for escapers to win time. In that last stage, there was a hilltop prime, where money could be won by the first cyclist that passed. Although a group had already passed that hill, Robic was not aware of this, and sprinted for this prime. When he reached the top, Brambilla had been dropped. Robic and Fachleitner, fifth in the general classification, started to work together, and left Brambilla and Ronconi minutes behind. Around 140 km before the finish, they were three minutes ahead of Brambilla, which made Robic the virtual leader of the race. At that point Robic told Fachleitner: "You can not win the Tour, because I will not let you escape. If you ride with me, I will pay you 100.000 Francs."

When they reached Paris, they had won 13 minutes on them, enough to make Robic the winner of the Tour de France.

Classification leadership and minor prizes

The cyclist to reach the finish in the least time was the winner of the stage. The time that each cyclist required to finish the stage was recorded. For the general classification, these times were added together. If a cyclist had received a time bonus, it was subtracted from this total; all time penalties were added to this total. The cyclist with the least accumulated time was the race leader, identified by the yellow jersey. With his victory, Robic won 500.000 francs. Additionally, future exhibitions and endorsements due to the Tour victory would give him another 3 to 4 million francs.

Additionally, there was the mountains classification, which did not have a jersey associated with it in 1947. Sixteen mountains were selected by the Tour organisation, divided in two classes. In the first-class mountains, the ten first cyclists received points, with 10 points for the first, 9 for the second, and so forth, to 1 point for the tenth. In the second-class mountains, only the first five cyclists received points, 5 for the first one to 1 for the fifth one. The mountains classification was won by Pierre Brambilla.

The team classification was calculated in 1947 by adding up the times of the best three cyclists of a team; the team with the least time was the winner.

The Souvenir Henri Desgrange was given in honour of Tour founder Henri Desgrange to the first rider to pass a point by his final residence, the "Villa Mia" in Beauvallon, Grimaud, on the French Riviera on stage 11. This prize was won by Raymond Impanis.

Final standings

General classification

Mountains classification

Team classification

Aftermath
Robic never wore the yellow jersey as leader in the general classification in 1947, because he only became leader in the final stage. Only Jan Janssen has repeated that, in the 1968 Tour de France.
Later in his career, Robic wore the yellow jersey for one day in the 1953 Tour de France.

Notes

References

Bibliography

External links

 
1947
1947 in French sport
1947 in road cycling
June 1947 sports events in Europe
July 1947 sports events in Europe